Qahrabad-e Soleyman (also Romanized as Qahrābād-e Soleymān; also known as Qahrābād) is a village in Khvor Khvoreh Rural District, Ziviyeh District, Saqqez County, Kurdistan Province, Iran. According to the census in  2006, its population was 425, in 81 families. The village is populated by Kurds.

Towns and villages in Saqqez County
Kurdish settlements in Kurdistan Province